The following is a list of the highest scoring games and widest winning margins in the TT Pro League since its inception in 1999. The record for the biggest win and highest scoring game is W Connection's 17–0 victory against Tobago United at Ato Boldon Stadium on 13 October 2004. In fact, 
the match produced five hat-tricks from Dwayne Ellis, Joe Luciano Viera, and nine goals from Saint Lucian Titus Elva, who is the current holder of the TT Pro League single game scoring record.

Highest scoring games

Widest winning margins

See also
 List of TT Pro League hat-tricks

References

External links
Official Website
Soca Warriors Online, TT Pro League

Games